Edward Anthony Holden (2 August 1805 – 28 August 1877) was a landowner who lived at Aston Hall, in Aston upon Trent, Derbyshire. He inherited land and bought more starting in 1833. He was High Sheriff of Derbyshire in 1838/9.

Biography
Holden was born in 1805 to Reverend Charles Edward Holden who in turn was born to James Shuttleworth.  Edward therefore came to have the name Holden by way of his grandmother, Mary who was the only child of Robert Holden (1676–1746).  Robert Holden willed his estates to the second or later son of his daughter, Mary and her husband James Shuttleworth on the condition that this son and his male heirs adopt the arms and name of Holden. James and Mary Shuttleworth and their daughter are captured in a large painting by Joseph Wright of Derby.). Edward Anthony Holden's father was born Charles Edward Shuttleworth in 1750.  He assumed the name of Holden and the accompanying estates in 1791.

The estates were established by an earlier Robert Holden (great grandfather to Mary) who had purchased lands in Aston upon Trent and Weston upon Trent in 1648. The family occupied the Hall in Weston and the Hall in Aston. The Holden family are thought to have come from Findern but Henry Holden settled in Aston in 1569. It was his son who started the estate and it was largely extended by Henry's grandson, Robert (father to Mary) who was a successful lawyer.

Edward Anthony Holden married Susan Drummond Moore (from Appleby Magna) on 22 November 1832 and began the expansion of the family's property in the following year. In 1839 he served as High Sheriff of Derbyshire taking over from his brother-in-law, George Moore, who had been Sheriff the year before.

Holden's eldest son, Lieutenant Edward Shuttleworth Holden, joined the 23rd Welch Fusiliers and served at the Crimean War. He is considered to be Aston on Trent first military victim when he died of wounds received in the assault on the Redan at the Siege of Sevastopol on 9 September 1855. A window in Aston's church is the memorial to Holden's eighteen-year-old son as well as a memorial to him in old Harrovian. Holden's second son, Charles Shuttleworth Holden b. 16 July 1838 d. 6 August 1872 was a Magistrate for the County of Derbyshire.  He married Juliana Evans Hartopp, daughter of Edward Bourchier Hartopp M.P. (Little Dalby) in London in 1863 and had one son, Edward Charles Shuttleworth Holden b. 7 January 1865 who was a Justice of the Peace and a Major in the Derbyshire Yeomanry Holden's younger son, Francis Shuttleworth Holden, attended Rugby School in 1865.

Holden's daughter, Rosamond Shuttleworth Holden, married the Reverend Degge Wilmot Sitwell on 16 April 1863. He was the vicar at Leamington Hastings and they had twelve children. His daughter, Mary Shuttleworth was an activist in the temperance movement and she funded Derby's first children's playground in Bold Lane.

In his home village of Aston, he had bought numerous cottages and fields in small lots including the, Coach & Horses and the schoolhouse. It isn't clear who eventually came into the possession of the lands in Leicestershire, but the lands in Aston were disposed of in one lot in 1898. William Dickson Winterbottom bought these lands from Edward Charles Shuttleworth Holden.

References

1805 births
1877 deaths
People from Aston-on-Trent
High Sheriffs of Derbyshire
English landowners
Derbyshire Yeomanry officers
19th-century British businesspeople